Lucas Hernández may refer to:
Lucas Hernandez, born 1996, French footballer
Lucas Hernández (footballer, born 1992), Uruguayan footballer